Karl Davey (born 14 February 1964 in Wakefield) is an English amateur and professional welterweight boxer of the 1970s, and '80s.

Boxing career

Amateur
Karl Davey trained at the White Rose Boys' Club Amateur Boxing Club , and was runner-up for the Amateur Boxing Association of England (ABAE) Intermediate 51 kg title against O. Jones (Dagenham) at The City of Derby, Assembly Rooms , Derby on Saturday 31 March 1979.

Professional
Karl Davey's first professional boxing bout was a fifth-round Technical knockout defeat by Kevin Howard at Hotel Piccadilly (Anglo-American Sporting Club), Manchester on Thursday 7 October 1982, Davey's second and final professional bout was a second-round Technical knockout victory over Mike Calderwood at Morley Town Hall, Morley, Leeds on Monday 18 April 1988.

Genealogical information
Karl Davey is the son of Terence Davey , and Lucy Davey (née Page) , and the younger brother of Paul A. Davey , and the twin brother of boxer Mark Davey.

References

External links
 

1964 births
English male boxers
Living people
Sportspeople from Wakefield
Welterweight boxers